The Nordwolle or more correctly the Nordwolle museum or the Nordwestdeutsche Museum für IndustrieKultur is situated in and around the engine house of the former Norddeutsche Wollkämmerei & Kammgarnspinnerei in Delmenhorst. Nordwolle was a dominant company that processed wool and worsted, it closed between 1981 and 1984. The building and the factory housing is listed as a Denkmalschutz 
The museum is an Anchor point on the European Route of Industrial Heritage.

History
In 1884, Christian Lahusen, a textile manufacturer from Bremen, set up the Norddeutsche Wollkämmerei & Kammgarnspinnerei (North German Wool Combing and Worsted Spinning Mill) next to the railway line in Delmenhorst, which brought wool from Bremen docks. The family business expanded into a major concern producing a quarter of all the world's rough yarn and employed almost 4,500 workers in the complex. Labour came from Eastern Europe. Between 1885 and 1905 the population of Delmenhorst tripled causing a chronic lack of housing. The firm responded by building ever more company housing on the “Nordwolle” site.

Under his son, Carl Lahusen, and his English born wife Armine Matthias, the factory town provided cooperative stores, canteens and baths, a hospital, a kindergarten and a library. The world slump and mismanagement bankrupted Lahusen's firm in 1931: though it continued in a smaller scale until 1981.

Museum
The Nordwolle Factory Museum opened in 1996 in the turbine hall and adjacent sheds. A year later the Municipal Museum open in the “Lichtstation”, the first engine room of the disused textile works.

Collections
The museum shows the production processes involved in worsted spinning and the social conditions of the young immigrant workers.

References
Notes

Footnotes

External links

 Nordwolle Website
 com.media veranstaltungscentrum in adjoining building
 Nordwolle
 Fotostrecke des Weser-Kurier zum Museum
 Familie Lahusen
 Arbeitskreis Fabrikmuseum
 Nordwolle Delmenhorst  Kulturportal Nordwest
 Spiegel magazine: "Der Untergang der Norddeutschen Wollkämmerei und Kammgarnspinnerei 1931 bis 1933"  The bankruptcy
 

Museums in Lower Saxony
Industry museums in Germany
Textile museums in Germany
European Route of Industrial Heritage Anchor Points